Early general elections were held in Fiji between 17 and 24 September 1977. They followed elections in March which resulted in a hung parliament and no party able to gain a majority. The new election resulted in a landslide win for the Alliance Party (Fiji) led by Prime Minister Kamisese Mara, which won 36 seats out of 52. It was aided by a split in the main opposition, the National Federation Party (NFP) and a decline in support for the Fijian Nationalist Party.

Background
The March elections had seen the NFP win 26 seats, the Alliance 24, the Fijian Nationalist Party one and an independent one.

With divisions apparent in the NFP, Governor-General George Cakobau asked Alliance Party leader and incumbent Prime Minister Kamisese Mara to form a government, claiming that Mara was able to command a majority. However, in June the Alliance Party attempted to pass a motion of confidence in the government but lost as the sole Fijian Nationalist Party MP voted against. At the end of June Cakobau dissolved parliament, resulting in fresh elections being held.

Prior to the elections, the NFP openly split in two, with the faction of leader Sidiq Koya and a rival NFP group running against each other in 24 seats. Koya's faction was symbolised by a dove, with the rival faction using a hibiscus flower

In August Fijian Nationalist Party leader Sakeasi Butadroka was given a six month jail sentence for inciting racial hatred.

Results
Koya lost his seat to a rival NFP candidate Jai Ram Reddy. Sole independent MP Osea Gavidi was narrowly re-elected, with five Alliance MPs being elected unopposed.

Aftermath
Following the elections, Mara appointed a twelve-member cabinet. Jai Ram Reddy became Leader of the Opposition.

Bill Clark later became Minister of Lands and Minerals and Sakiasi Waqanivavalagi became Minister of Youth and Sport.

In a cabinet reshuffle in January 1981, Clark became Minister of Energy, David Toganivalu became Minister of Commerce and Industry, Mohammed Ramzan became Minister of Health, Tomasi Vakatora became Minister of Labour, Industry Relations and Immigration, Ted Beddoes became Minister of Tourism, transport and Civil Aviation and Waqanivavalagi added Lands and Mineral Resources to his Youth and Sport portfolio.

See also
List of members of the Parliament of Fiji (1977–1982)

References

Notes

1977 09
General
Fiji
Fiji
Fiji